This is a list of Academy Award winners and nominees from Romania.

Best Picture

Best Supporting Actor

Best Supporting Actress

Best Adapted Screenplay

Best Original Screenplay

Best Story

Best International Feature Film

Best Documentary Feature

Best Production Design

Best Live Action Short Film

Honorary Award

Nominations and Winners

References 

Lists of Academy Award winners and nominees by nationality or region
Academy Award winners and nominees
Academy Award winners and nominees